John Sciandra (born Giovanni Sciandra, ; April 10, 1899 – September 11, 1949) was an Italian-American crime boss of the Bufalino crime family of Pennsylvania from 1933 until 1949.

Early life
Sciandra was born on April 10, 1899 in Montedoro, Sicily, to Angelo and Leonarda La Porta Sciandra. With his parents and siblings, Andrew, James and Pasqualina, he immigrated to the United States in April 1908, settling in Buffalo, New York. In 1921, he moved in Pittston, Pennsylvania, working as a coal miner; Sciandra became an enforcer and bootlegger for Bufalino crime family boss Santo Volpe. In 1928, Sciandra's cousin, Carolyn, married Russell Bufalino, future crime boss of the family.

Sciandra married Josephine Mancino, and had three sons, Joseph, John Jr. and Angelo, and one daughter.

Criminal career
Like so many crime families, they are built upon blood ties, long standing friendships and various powerful arms. The Bufalino crime family would have four very powerful members who pulled all the strings. These included Santo "King of the Night" Volpe, Angelo Polizzi, Joseph "Joe the Barber" Barbara and Sciandra. In 1933, after being questioned about his possible involvement in the murder of Samuel Wichner, Santo Volpe appointed John Sciandra as boss and quietly worked behind the scenes within the family while also devoting more attention to legitimate business. Polizzi became consigliere, maintaining this role before moving to Detroit and getting involved in organized crime in that city.

Death
Sciandra died of natural causes on September 11, 1949. He is buried in Denison Cemetery, Swoyersville, Pennsylvania.

Notes

References

 

1899 births
1949 deaths
American crime bosses
American gangsters of Sicilian descent
Bufalino crime family
Burials in Pennsylvania
Criminals from Pennsylvania
Italian emigrants to the United States
Italian crime bosses
People from Buffalo, New York
People from Montedoro
People from Pittston, Pennsylvania
Gangsters from the Province of Caltanissetta